Shimmer (real name Selinda Flinders) is a fictional supervillainess in the DC Comics universe. The older sister of fellow supervillain Mammoth, she is a founding member of the Fearsome Five and enemy of the Teen Titans.

The character made her live-action debut in the second season of the DC Universe series Titans, portrayed by Hanneke Talbot.

Publication history
Shimmer first appeared in The New Teen Titans #3 and was created by George Pérez and Marv Wolfman.

Fictional character biography
Selinda and her younger brother Baran (a.k.a. the supervillain Mammoth) are superhumans from Australia. Teased by their classmates for being different, the frustrated children used their powers to fight their tormentors, only to be driven out of town by the angry and frightened parents. Selinda and Baran's parents sent them off to the country of Markovia, where they were put in the care of scientist Dr. Helga Jace. While Dr. Jace tried to teach the young mutants a sense of morality, the two instead turned to a life of crime.

Shimmer is one of the founding members of the Fearsome Five, which she joins after answering an ad placed in the Underworld Star by Doctor Light. Shimmer and the Fearsome Five fought with the Teen Titans on numerous occasions; they also have battled Superman. Shimmer eventually renounces her criminal life and retires, along with Baran, to a Tibetan monastery. Later, her peaceful existence is ended when her former teammate Psimon tracks her down. Using his psychic powers, Psimon turns Shimmer's body to glass and shatters it.

Shimmer later returns to life. Doctor Sivana assembles a new version of the Fearsome Five, including Shimmer's brother Mammoth. Sivana is able to recruit Mammoth by promising to resurrect his sister. Sivana has Psimon reassemble the broken shards of Shimmer's glass body, then uses his superscience to restore her to life. In this new form, Shimmer adopts a revealing Goth-like black leather outfit in place of her original gold bodystocking.

Shimmer is mentioned as a possible, but not likely, source for kryptonite in Countdown to Infinite Crisis (2005).

Shimmer is one of the villains featured in Salvation Run.

She and Mammoth eventually join up with a new Fearsome Five roster that is hired by Calculator to kidnap Wonder Girl and distract the new team of Teen Titans while he abducts Kid Eternity. Shimmer and her teammates are eventually defeated, but in the process manage to cause the death of Kid Devil. Shimmer and the Fearsome Five apparently escape soon after their incarceration. They attempt to assassinate Donna Troy when she attends the opening of a resort in Miami. Troy easily defeats the villains, but Shimmer taunts her by refusing to reveal who hired them.

The New 52
In the timeline of the 2011 DC Comics continuity reboot, The New 52, Shimmer is reintroduced as a member of the Fearsome Five. The group later appears are members of the Secret Society, which are allied with the Crime Syndicate. She is sent with the other members of the Fearsome Five, Jinx, Mammoth, Gizmo and Psimon, to team up with Doctor Psycho and Hector Hammond in order to fight against Cyborg and the Metal Men. She is then defeated by Platinum.

DC Rebirth
In the timeline of DC's 2016 book relaunch, DC Rebirth, Shimmer appears as part of the Fearsome Five.

Powers and abilities
Shimmer is a metahuman with ability to transmute any element or compound into any other.

In other media
 Shimmer makes non-speaking appearances in Young Justice. This version is a member of the Light. Initially a human martial artist, she works as Kobra's right hand woman and bodyguard until she is incarcerated in Belle Reve Penitentiary and eventually becomes an enforcer under Queen Bee as a member of the sub-group Onslaught. After being experimented on by the Reach, Shimmer becomes a metahuman.
 Shimmer makes a brief appearance in the Titans episode "Rose", portrayed by Hanneke Talbot.

References

DC Comics female supervillains
Fictional Australian people
Characters created by George Pérez
Characters created by Marv Wolfman
Comics characters introduced in 1981
DC Comics metahumans
Suicide Squad members
Fictional characters with elemental transmutation abilities